The Men's individual pursuit took place at 5 October 2010 at the Indira Gandhi Arena.

Qualifying

Finals

Final

Bronze medal match

External links
 Commonwealth Games: Track Day 1 canadiancyclist.com

Track cycling at the 2010 Commonwealth Games
Cycling at the Commonwealth Games – Men's individual pursuit